= Al husayn =

Al Husayn or Al husayn may refer to:

- Husayn ibn Ali
- Al husayn, Yemen
